Georgia's state mental asylum located in Milledgeville, Georgia, now known as the Central State Hospital (CSH), has been the state's largest facility for treatment of mental illness and developmental disabilities.  In continuous operation since accepting its first patient in December 1842, the hospital was founded as the Georgia State Lunatic, Idiot, and Epileptic Asylum, and was also known as the Georgia State Sanitarium and Milledgeville State Hospital during its long history.  By the 1960s the facility had grown into the largest mental hospital in the world (contending with Pilgrim Psychiatric Center in New York).  Its landmark Powell Building and the vast, abandoned 1929 Jones Building stand among some 200 buildings on two thousand acres that once housed nearly 12,000 patients.

As of 2016 the facility offers short-stay acute treatment for people with mental illness, residential units and habilitation programs for people with developmental disabilities, recovery programs that require a longer stay, and specialized skilled and ICF nursing centers. Some programs serve primarily the central-Georgia region while other programs serve counties throughout the state.

History

In the first decades of the 1800s there was a movement in several states to reform prisons, create public schools, and establish state-run hospitals for the mentally ill. In 1837, the Georgia State Legislature responded to a call from Governor Wilson Lumpkin, by passing a bill calling for the creation of a "State Lunatic, Idiot, and Epileptic Asylum." Located in Milledgeville, then the state capital, the facility opened in 1842.

Under Dr. Thomas A. Green (1845–1879), care of patients was based on the "institution as family". This modeled hospitals to resemble an extended family. Green ate with staff and patients daily and abolished chain and rope restraints.

The hospital population grew to nearly 12,000 in the 1960s. During the following decade, the population began to decrease due to the emphasis on deinstitutionalization, the addition of other public psychiatric (regional) hospitals throughout the state, the availability of psychotropic medications, an increase in community mental health programs, and many individuals moving to community living arrangements. During FY2004-FY2005, the hospital served more than 9,000 consumers (duplicates counted) - from nearly every Georgia county.

In 2010, the Georgia Department of Behavioral Health and Developmental Disabilities announced that the hospital would be closed, but it has not been; instead, it has become the state's treatment and custodial center for justice system referrals and commitments.

Notable patients 

 Anjette Lyles, American restaurateur responsible for the poisoning deaths of four relatives between 1952 and 1958 in Macon, Georgia, apprehended on May 6, 1958, and sentenced to death yet later was involuntary commitmented due her to diagnosis of paranoid schizophrenia, died aged 52 on December 4, 1977, at the Central State Hospital, Milledgeville in Georgia.

See also
List of hospitals in the United States
List of hospitals in Georgia

References

Sources
 Book, Constance Ledoux, and David Ezell. "Freedom of Speech and Institutional Control: Patient Publications at Central State Hospital, 1934-1978." Georgia Historical Quarterly 85 (2001): 106–26.
 Cranford, Peter G. But for the Grace of God: The Inside Story of the World's Largest Insane Asylum, Milledgeville. Augusta, Ga.: Great Pyramid Press, 1981.
 Graham, Paul K. Admission Register of Central State Hospital, Milledgeville, Georgia, 1842-1861. Decatur, Ga.: The Genealogy Company, 2011.

External links

A recent photoessay on the abandoned Walker building at Central State Hospital.
Article on the history of Central State
Renaissance Park Reimagine - Reinvent - Reinvest

Psychiatric hospitals in Georgia (U.S. state)
Buildings and structures in Baldwin County, Georgia
Historic American Buildings Survey in Georgia (U.S. state)